Suni is a comune (municipality) in the Province of Oristano in the Italian region Sardinia, located about  northwest of Cagliari and about  north of Oristano.

Suni borders the following municipalities: Bosa, Flussio, Modolo, Pozzomaggiore, Sagama, Sindia, Tinnura.

Demographic evolution

References

Cities and towns in Sardinia